List of United States Navy ships is a comprehensive listing of all ships that have been in service to the United States Navy during the history of that service. The US Navy maintains its official list of ships past and present at the Naval Vessel Register (NVR), although it does not include early vessels. The NVR US Navy Inactive Classification Symbols is a concise list of inactive definitions. The Dictionary of American Naval Fighting Ships includes much detail on historical ships, and was used as the basis for many of Wikipedia's ship articles.

Due to the large number of entries, the list has been divided by the first letter of the ship's name—see the infobox. 

See also
 List of current ships of the United States Navy 
 List of U.S. military vessels named after living Americans
 List of U.S. military vessels named after women
 List of United States Navy ships named after US states
 List of United States Navy losses in World War II - abbreviated list
 List of US Navy ships sunk or damaged in action during World War II - detailed list
 List of ships of the United States Army
 List of ships of the United States Air Force
 List of ships of the United States Coast Guard
 List of museum ships of the United States military

References

Primary

Secondary
 navy.mil: List of homeports and their ships
 NavSource Naval History

Navy
+
Ships list